Rainbow Children's Medicare, commonly known as Rainbow Hospitals, is an Indian chain of paediatric hospitals headquartered in Hyderabad. Founded by Dr. Ramesh Kancharla in 1999, the hospital's main focus is paediatric and maternal healthcare services. Rainbow Hospitals' flagship facility is located at Banjara Hills, Hyderabad. The Rainbow Hospital Group currently operates out of 15 hospitals and 3 outpatient clinics – seven in Hyderabad, three in Bangalore, two each in Delhi, Chennai, Vijayawada and Visakhapatnam.

Awards

 ICICI Lombard and CNBC-TV18 India Healthcare Award for Best Pediatric Hospital-2018 
 VCCircle Awards 2016 - Best Healthcare company of the year 2016.
 VCCircle Awards 2015 - Best Hospital in Single Specialty services.

Records
Rainbow Hospitals sets the "Guinness World Record —for the largest gathering of people born prematurely under one roof" on World Prematurity Day held on 17 November 2016

References

External links
 

Hospitals in Hyderabad, India
Health care companies of India
Indian companies established in 1999
Hospitals established in 1999
Hospital networks in India
Companies based in Hyderabad, India
Companies listed on the National Stock Exchange of India
Companies listed on the Bombay Stock Exchange